The Hitachi (also known as Martin & King or Stainless Steel) was an electric multiple unit that operated on the Melbourne suburban railway network between 1972 and 2014. Electrical equipment was supplied by Commonwealth Engineering to designs by Hitachi of Japan, leading to their official name today, though no actual Hitachi-supplied components were used in their construction. They were the last suburban trains in Melbourne with no air conditioning. A total of 355 carriages were built between 1972 and 1981, including a replacement carriage for one written off while the fleet was still being delivered.

Configuration

The revised carriage design enabled a six car Hitachi to seat 560 passengers, up from 540 for a seven car Harris, and allowed a maximum load of 1,500 passengers, 300 more than a Harris.

As delivered, Hitachi trains were composed of three types of carriage; driving motor, trailer and driving trailer; coded M, T and D respectively. These cars were arranged in sets of M-T-T-M and M-D, which could be arranged together to create a six car set. Early M and D carriages delivered were provided with nose doors at the front of the cab, which allowed passengers to move through them and between coupled units in a train. This feature did not last, as instructions were soon issued to lock the doors to cabs to prevent unauthorised access. The nose doors also tended to leak and cause draughts, and so the feature was omitted from later carriages, and the door was covered over in sets containing them.

All but one of the 68 D carriages (353D, involved in a collision at Pakenham on 16 April 1980, that also resulted in the scrapping of guard's van Z286) produced were converted into T carriages by the late 1970s, in order to form symmetrical M-T-M units for the opening of the City Loop. These units could be doubled to make six car sets, configured as M-T-M-M-T-M, which became the de facto unit configuration in the 1990s, due to refurbishments.

The 237 motor carriages that have been in service have been numbered 1M through 237M, and the 117 trailer carriages, 1901T through 2017T. On 15 August 2009, the remaining Hitachi carriages were renumbered in order to make way for the second order of X'Trapolis trains, which would also start from 1. The remaining M cars were renumbered from 273M up to 300M, however the new numbering does not reflect the age of each car. The numbering reflects which T car is in each set, the lowest numbered T car receives the lowest numbered M cars, in order of which M car was already the lowest (for example, 2007T was the highest-numbered T car, so 23M was renumbered 299M as it was lower than 233M, which was renumbered 300M).

Service

Intended to replace the first generation of electric trains, the Swing Door and Tait, the stainless steel Hitachi was the first Melbourne suburban train to feature heated carriages and power-closing doors operated by the guard, and opened by hand. The M and D carriages were built by Martin & King, and the T carriages by Victorian Railways at their Newport Workshops.

The first to operate in revenue service was the four-carriage set 1M-901T-902T-2M, on 24 December 1972 on the St Kilda line (since converted to light rail). Trains originally wore a plain stainless silver livery, receiving green and gold side stripes with the introduction of the Metropolitan Transit Authority. Side logos were altered with their re-branding as The Met, and were again altered with the privatisation of The Met's metropolitan rail services as Hillside Trains (later Connex), and Bayside Trains (later M>Train), with the latter also applying branding to the front. When the carriages were refurbished under Connex, the green and gold livery was removed, restoring the carriages to their original 'silver' colour, with the addition of Connex blue and gold striping on the front face of the leading cars, and two blue and gold side panels near the driver's cab. The seats in the passenger area also received new fabric, similar to that of an Alstom refurbished Comeng. With the takeover by Metro, the Connex logos were covered up with Metro stickers.

Beginning in 1992, the Hitachi fleet received internal, external and cab upgrades at the PTC's Ballarat North and Bendigo Workshops. The refurbishment included the replacement of the steel flooring in each car where it has reached the end of its service life, replacing existing rubber or carpet flooring with vinyl, replacing interior panels above the seats with a new anti-vandal material, replacing the woodgrain upper panels and bone-coloured roof with off-white panels, new seat pads and repainting and strengthening the seat modules, removal of the luggage racks and advertising boards, overhaul of windows and doors including the motors that were worked by air and a general clean of the exterior and new green and gold stripes applied. The refurbishment of over half of the Hitachi M cars also included improved air-conditioning in the driver's cab and double-thickness windscreens, with aluminium replacing the original rubber surrounds. These M car works were completed by early 1994. After these upgrades were made, the non-upgraded M cars were no longer allowed to lead a train in revenue service, effectively making them B units. Two M cars have been preserved in their original unmodified form, while a third M car (187M) as modified by the PTC is on static display at the AHRS Museum in Williamstown.

In late 2007, Hitachi set 37M-1979T-36M-110M-1910T-42M was modified to meet driver union requirements (including cab air conditioning) and also re-stickered into Connex livery. All remaining sets have since received the same treatment, as well as a refurbished interior. In 2008, the remaining seven 6-car trains were again modified, mainly with a more powerful driver's air-conditioning system replacing the small vents on the roof, however three other 'leading' cars (9M, 89M and 225M, now 277M, 281M and 296M respectively) were not modified and relegated to being in the centre of the trains indefinitely.

Retirement

New X'Trapolis and Siemens trains were progressively introduced from 2002 to replace the aging Hitachi fleet. The X'Trapolis and Siemens trains have features such as push button operated doors and air conditioning, the lack of the latter feature making the Hitachis unpopular with Melbourne commuters. A majority of the sets were withdrawn between 2002 and 2005, with withdrawn carriages having been either scrapped, sold to private buyers across Australia, stored, or acquired by railway museums and preservation groups. Three Hitachi motor carriages were lifted and fixed to the roof of Easey's Restaurant in Collingwood.

The final six 6-carriage trains were to be withdrawn after the 2006 Commonwealth Games, but instead received a minor refurbishment and remained in revenue service until December 2013, due to a high increase in patronage. A report in February 2007, by which time 31 trains in the Siemens fleet were out of service due to safety concerns, said the Victorian Government was negotiating to lease one 6-carriage set from rail preservation group Elecrail, and repurchase another 3 carriages from a private seller to supplement the fleet. An additional three 3-car Hitachi trains were purchased back from Australian businessman Mr Horne in April 2007 to provide spare parts for the fleet. The Elecrail set re-entered service in December 2007.

In September 2008, Transport Safety Victoria withdrew the remaining trains from service due to concerns over corrosion around the doors and floor. A series of tests were to be carried out before the trains were sent to Ballarat North Workshops for repair work. It was decided to proceed with the repairs as the trains were required under a new timetable for November 2008, costing approximately $2 million.

In April 2014, a farewell tour for the Hitachi was held, organised by Elecrail and in cooperation with Metro. The tour encompassed the Craigieburn, South Morang and Sunbury lines. During this event, Public Transport Victoria confirmed that the Hitachi had seen the last of revenue service in Melbourne, with one set likely to be preserved, and the remainder scrapped.

Between 2012 and 2015, the remaining seven Hitachi sets were put into storage at Newport Workshops, with specific transfers happening in January 2013 and July 2014 before in September and October 2015, the remaining three sets still in storage were transferred from Macauley Light Repair Centre to Newport Workshops. In 2018, one of the remaining Hitachi units was moved to Bendigo Workshops for long-term storage. The remaining Hitachi units that did not transfer to Bendigo still remain at Newport Workshops as of 1 December 2019.

In May 2020, two Hitachi motor carriages were transported by truck from Newport Workshops to Molong NSW.

Gallery

References

Hitachi trains at VICSIG
Peter J Vincent: Hitachi M cars
Peter J Vincent: Hitachi T cars
Peter J Vincent: Hitachi D cars

Melbourne rail rollingstock
Electric multiple units of Victoria (Australia)
1500 V DC multiple units of Victoria